Kevin Burke may refer to:
Kevin Burke (musician) (born 1950), Irish fiddler
Kevin Burke (CEO), chairman, president, and CEO of Consolidated Edison
Kevin Burke (judge) (born 1950), district judge in Hennepin County, Minnesota
Kevin Burke (quarterback) (born 1993), college football quarterback, two-time Gagliardi Trophy winner
Kevin Burke (American football coach), American football coach and wide receiver
Kevin Burke (hurler) (born 2000), Irish hurler 
Kevin C. A. Burke (1929–2018), British-American geologist, professor of geology and tectonics at the University of Houston, USA
Kevin M. Burke (born 1946), American attorney and politician in the Massachusetts House of Representatives